Opelika (YTB–798) was a United States Navy  named for Opelika, Alabama.

Construction

The contract for Opelika was awarded 15 June 1967. She was laid down on 23 February 1968 at Marinette, Wisconsin, by Marinette Marine and launched 21 August 1968.

Operational history
Opelika was delivered to the Navy 30 January 1968 for service at the Naval Station Subic Bay, Philippines. She continued busy operations there until that base closed in 1992. She was transferred to Naval Station Yokosuka, Japan. She was struck from the naval register in February 2015.

References

External links
 

 

Natick-class large harbor tugs
Ships built by Marinette Marine
1966 ships